Lau (Law) is a Jukunoid language of Lau LGA, Taraba State, Nigeria. Lau speakers claim that their language is mutually intelligible with the Jukunoid language varieties spoken in Kunini, Bandawa, and Jeshi. They also live alongside the Central Sudanic-speaking Laka (Hausa name: Lakawa), who live in Laka ward of Lau LGA.

Lau had been previously misclassified as a Mbum language along with Laka.

Names
Names for the Lau language, people, and town:

Town name: Làw (literally ‘mud’)
People: Wĩ̄ Lâw ‘people of Lau’
People (Hausa name): Lau haaɓe ‘the indigenous of Lau’ (from Fula haaɓe ‘servants, slaves, non-Fulani’)
Language: Wĩ̄ Lâwmã̄ ‘the language of the people of Lau’

Sample words
Some sample words in Lau from Idiatov (2017):

References

Jukunoid languages
Languages of Nigeria